Austruca mjoebergi is a species of fiddler crab discovered by and named after the Swedish zoologist Eric Mjöberg (1882–1938), member of a Swedish scientific expedition to Australia in the early 1900s.

The crab is found along the north and northwest coast of Australia (approximately from Dampier to the Gulf of Carpentaria and on Papua New Guinea's northwest coast).

Austruca mjoebergi was formerly in the genus Uca, but in 2016 it was placed in the genus Austruca, a former subgenus of Uca.

Claw bluffing
Male Austruca mjoebergi rely heavily on their enlarged claw to signal dominance and fighting prowess. Crabs which lose their large claw will occasionally regenerate a lighter, cheaper claw (requiring less energy to produce). Research has shown that, while crabs with these 'cheap' claws are worse fighters than crabs with strong claws of a similar size, they are just as effective at intimidating other crabs based on claw size alone.

References

Ocypodoidea
Arthropods of Oceania
Crustaceans described in 1924
Taxa named by Mary J. Rathbun